2006 Masters of Curling may refer to:

2006 Masters of Curling (February)
2006 Masters of Curling (December)